Hooker and Brown are two mythical mountains, once reputed to lie on the great Divide of the Canadian Rockies in Jasper National Park, bordering the Athabasca Pass, the old passage for the fur trade.

Discovery and Naming
David Thompson, a Canadian surveyor, explorer and geographer, first established the route through Athabasca Pass in January 1811 when the Peigan Indians closed Howse Pass to prevent his trading with their rivals, the Kootenay people.
Although he mapped the route carefully, Thompson was not interested in mountains and did not name or note them in his journals. His journey joined with the Columbia river and the trail became the premier trade passage over the Rockies until the decline of the fur trade.

In April 1827, David Douglas, a Scottish Biologist collecting for the Royal Botanic Institution of Glasgow, and sponsored by Sir William Hooker, crossed the pass. Lagging the other voyageurs, he made an unprecedented decision to abandon the trail and to ascend the northern peak in deep snow.

"After breakfast at one o’clock, being, as I conceive, on the highest part of the route, I became desirous of ascending one of the peaks, and accordingly I set out alone on snowshoes to that on the left hand or west side, being to all appearances the highest. The labour of ascending the lower part, which is covered with pines, is great beyond description, sinking on many occasions to the middle. Halfway up vegetation ceases entirely, not so much a vestige of moss or lichen on the stones. Here I found it less laborious as I walked on the hard crust. One-third from the summit it becomes a mountain of pure ice, sealed far over by Nature’s hand as a momentous work of Nature’s God. ... The view from the summit is of too awful a cast to afford pleasure. Nothing can be seen, in every direction as far as the eye can reach, except mountains towering above each other, rugged beyond description. ... The height from its base may be about 5,500 feet; timber 2,750 feet; a few mosses and lichens 500 more; 1,000 feet of perpetual snow; the remainder, towards the top, 1,250, as I have said, glacier with a thin covering of snow on it. The ascent took me five hours; descending only one and a quarter. ... This peak, the highest yet known in the northern continent of America, I feel a sincere pleasure in naming Mount Brown, in honour of R. Brown, Esq., the illustrious botanist... A little to the southward is one nearly the same height, rising into a sharper point. This I named Mount Hooker [after his sponsor, William Hooker] ..."

Historical Mystery and Impact
Douglas did not know of the height of the Athabasca Pass when he crossed. The officer bore a name so similar to Lieutenant-Governor Sir George Simpson that many attributed his erroneous elevation calculation to the more eminent person, and thus gave it credibility.
Douglas wrote in his published journal:

"Being well rested by one o'clock, I set out with the view of ascending what seemed to be the highest peak on the north. Its height does not seem to be less than 16,000 or 17,000 feet above the level of the sea. After passing over the lower ridge I came to about 1,200 feet of, by far, the most difficult and fatiguing walking I have ever experienced, and the utmost care was required to tread over the crust of the snow..."

But Douglas was off on another expedition (one from which he would not return, as his eyesight had become so poor that he fell into an occupied wild boar trap on the Sandwich Isles – Hawaii) when his journal was published. The editing of his journal may have been conducted by Hooker himself, which calls into question the motivation and objectivity of such a noted figure.
This publication was in a secondary journal which was quickly forgotten, however, the heights had made an indelible impression, most notably on Aaron Arrowsmith, the great English mapmaker.

On all maps following the publication of the journal, maps of the Rockies showed Hooker and Brown between 15,000 and 17,000 feet tall. When the transcontinental railway was pushing through the mountains on it way to join with the British Columbian spur, it opened the area to the mountaineers of Europe and the East Coast. After Assiniboine was summitted, a race began to claim the highest peaks. The maps unequivocally stated that Hooker and Brown were thus, but after several seasons of exploring and hardship, no trace of such high mountains were found. They did impel the men to discover and map the entire Rocky Mountains system of ranges.

The peaks remain a fable of the twenty-first century. Albertan author Jerry Auld's 2009 novel, Hooker & Brown, is centered around the mythology and the mystery of the mountains.

It was only climbed in 1924, nearly a century after Douglass' visit of Mount Brown. The mountain Douglass named Mount Hooker more likely is McGillivray Ridge (or Rock), which had been named years before Douglass crossed the Athabasca Pass.<ref>J. Monroe Thorington, A Note on the OriginalJournals of David Douglas, in The Glittering Mountains of Canada: A Record of Exploration and Pioneer Ascents in the Canadian Rockies], Rocky Mountain Books Ltd, 2012, pp. 279-288.</ref>

Timeline

References
Stephen Slemon and Zac Robinson (2011) Deception in High Places, The Canadian Alpine Journal, Vol. 94, pp. 12–17.

External links
“The Canadian Alps – The History of Mountaineering in Canada” R. W. Sandford, Altitude Publishing, 1990
PeakFinder.com – Canadian Rockies Reference
Information on Jerry Auld's novel, Hooker & Brown'', can be found on his website, the book site

Geography of Alberta
Hiking trails in Alberta
Canadian Rockies
Mountains of Alberta
Geology of the Rocky Mountains
Robert Brown (botanist, born 1773)